Jesper Møllegaard Staal (born March 1, 1972) is a Danish sprint canoer who competed from the early 20th century to the mid-2000s (decade). He won two medals in the K-2 1000 m event at the ICF Canoe Sprint World Championships with a gold in 1994 and a silver in 1997.

Staal also competed in three Summer Olympics, earning his best finish of sixth twice (K-2 500 m: 1992, K-2 1000 m: 1996).

References

1972 births
Canoeists at the 1992 Summer Olympics
Canoeists at the 1996 Summer Olympics
Canoeists at the 2000 Summer Olympics
Danish male canoeists
Living people
Olympic canoeists of Denmark
ICF Canoe Sprint World Championships medalists in kayak